Cuscatlania is a genus of flowering plants belonging to the family Nyctaginaceae.

Its native range is Central America.

Species:
 Cuscatlania vulcanicola Standl.

References

Nyctaginaceae
Caryophyllales genera